is a Japanese footballer who plays as a left back for  club FC Tokyo.

Career
After attending Josai International University, Tokumoto signed for FC Ryukyu in January 2018.

Club statistics
.

References

External links

Profile at J. League
Profile at FC Tokyo
Profile at FC Ryukyu

1995 births
Living people
Josai International University alumni
Association football people from Okinawa Prefecture
Japanese footballers
J1 League players
J2 League players
J3 League players
FC Ryukyu players
Fagiano Okayama players
FC Tokyo players
Association football defenders